The Falu Party a local political party in Falun, Sweden. Party leader is Ulf Elgemyr.

In 1998, FP got 10.9% of the votes and six seats in the municipal council. In 2002 it got 2441 votes (7.5%) and five seats.

1998-2002 FP was part of a local six-party coalition governing the municipality, consisting of FP, Moderate Party, Centre Party, Christian Democrats, People's Party - Liberals and Swedish Senior Citizen Interest Party.

Example of current demand of the party (from the party website):
 Social Services to remain in its present location
 No extra funding for the Folk Music Festival
 New courthouse, but not on Kullen
 More attention to the situation of children and youth
 Law and order, support the work to increase police resources
 Supports construction of nine-hole golf-course in Linghed
 Supports restoration of fire station in Enviken
 Opposes decay of buildings in Sågmyra
 Smother traffic in the centre, open Åsgatan- Kristinegatan for one-way traffic.
 Raise a statue of Nobel Laureate Selma Lagerlöf
 Well-functioning school and good elderly care.

External links
 Party website

Swedish local political parties